China Railway Siyuan Survey and Design Group Co., Ltd., referred to as Siyuan, is a Chinese engineering survey and design enterprises, under the China Railway Construction Corporation, headquartered in Wuhan, Hubei Province.

In 2011, its annual revenues from engineering survey and design service reached 2.989 billion yuan, the enterprise ranked in the second place for engineering survey and design in China in terms of annual revenues.

References 

Railway companies of China